This is a list in alphabetical order of cricketers who have played first-class cricket for the Durham University Centre of Cricketing Excellence (UCCE) and Durham MCC University (MCCU).

The Durham UCCE side first played cricket in 2000 and played its first first-class matches in 2001. It developed out of Durham University Cricket Club and was established under head coach Graeme Fowler, a former England Test cricketer. The UCCE side continued until the 2009 season, when the Marylebone Cricket Club (MCC) took over funding from the England and Wales Cricket Board, at which point it was renamed Durham MCCU. MCC funding came to an end in July 2020, although no matches were played in the 2020 season due to the restrictions put in place during the Coronavirus outbreak. In December 2019 the ECB announced that matches with MCCU sides would lose their first-class status as of the 2021 season.

Players listed are those who have played first-class cricket for the side, either as the UCCE team or the MCCU side. Some players will have played senior cricket for other teams.

A
Tim Alexander (cricketer)
Will Angus
Jamie Atkinson

B

C

D

E
Joe Emanuel
Laurie Evans (cricketer)

F

G

H

J

K
William Kirby (cricketer)
Eben Kurtz

L

M

N
Daniel Newton (cricketer)
Charlie Nicholls (cricketer)

O
Xavier Owen

P

R

S

T
Delroy Taylor
Greg Thompson (cricketer)
Mark Thorburn

V
Freddie van den Bergh
Charles van der Gucht

W

References

Durham UCCE and MCCU
Sport at Durham University
Student cricket in the United Kingdom